Westgate was an electoral ward of Newcastle upon Tyne in North East England from 2004 to 2018. The population of the ward taken at the 2011 Census was 10,059.

It contained the majority of the city centre. Westgate Ward was succeeded by Arthur's Hill Ward and Monument Ward.

References

External links 
 Newcastle Council Ward Info: Westgate

Districts of Newcastle upon Tyne
Wards of Newcastle upon Tyne